This is list of archives in Bolivia.

Archives in Bolivia 

 National Archive and Library of Bolivia
 Archivo Central de la Prefectura del Departamento de Santa Cruz
 Archivo de la Ciudad de la Paz
 Archivo del Instituto Nacional de Estadistica
 Archivo del Instituto Nacional de Reforma Agraria
 Archivo Franciscano de Tarija

See also 

 List of archives
 List of museums in Bolivia
 Culture of Bolivia

External links 
 General Archives (all)

 
Archives
Bolivia
Archives